Horacio García (4 October 1931-24 August 2015) was a Uruguayan sailor. He won the ICSA Coed Dinghy National Championship with the Massachusetts Institute of Technology sailing team in 1954, and competed in the Dragon event at the 1960 Summer Olympics.

He was a board member of the Snipe Class International Racing Association and Commodore in 1994. He also served during 17 years as commodore of the Yacht Club Punta del Este.

References

External links
 

1931 births
2015 deaths
Uruguayan male sailors (sport)
Olympic sailors of Uruguay
Sailors at the 1960 Summer Olympics – Dragon
Sportspeople from Montevideo
MIT Engineers sailors
Snipe class sailors